The Lapraka Airfield or Tirana Aerodrome  was an airfield located in Tirana, Albania. It is the former airport of Albania's capital. It used to house an air force regiment with Y-5s, operating from the old runway, and later, from the grass runway. Currently, Lapraka only houses the helicopters of the Albanian government. The airfield is located in the north western part of Tirana, although it is hardly recognizable as such. From the town center, take the Rruga Durresi towards Durres.

References

Airports in Albania
Buildings and structures in Tirana